White-Washing Race: The Myth of a Color-Blind Society is a 2005 book arguing that racial discrimination is still evident on contemporary American society.  The book draws on the fields of sociology, political science, economics, criminology, and legal studies.  The authors argue that the inequalities which prevail in America today, especially with regard to wages, income, and access to housing and health care, are the effects of either cultural or individual failures.

The book provides an alternative explanation: that racism—particularly institutionalized racism—is as much a problem in America as in earlier times. Such inequalities continue to exist in the labor market, the welfare state, the criminal justice system, and schools and universities.  The book recounts the history of advancement among black Americans since the 1960s, and current anti-discrimination policies, but advocates new policies for increased racial equality in a post-affirmative action world.

Authors
Michael K. Brown and David Wellman are currently professors at UC Santa Cruz. Marjorie M. Schultz and Troy Duster are Professors at UC Berkeley, while Elliott Currie is a Professor in the Department of Criminology, Law and Society at UC Irvine. Troy Duster is also a professor at New York University. David B. Oppenheimer is Associate Dean for Academic Affairs and Professor of Law at Golden Gate University in San Francisco. Martin Carnoy is currently employed at Stanford University as a Professor of Education and Economics.

Awards
Gustavus Myers Outstanding Book Award: Gustavus Myers Awards 
Benjamin L. Hooks Outstanding Book Award: Benjamin L. Hooks Institute for Social Change 
C. Wright Mills Award Finalist: Society for the Study of Social Problems

See also
Racism in the United States
Poverty in the United States
Color blindness (race)
Constitutional colorblindness

Related books
Unequal Childhoods: Class, Race, and Family Life by Annette Lareau,
Working-Class Heroes: Protecting Home, Community, and Nation in a Chicago Neighborhood by Maria Kefalas,
Colored White: Transcending the Racial Past by David R. Roediger

References
Brown K., Michael. White-Washing Race: The Myth of a Color-blind Society. Berkeley, CA. University of California Press, 2003.

External links
 "Whitewashing Race: The Myth of a Color-Blind Society"
 "Whitewashing Race: The Myth of a Color-Blind Society (review)"

2005 non-fiction books
American political books
Non-fiction books about racism
Race in the United States
University of California Press books